Gnaeus Mallius Maximus was a Roman politician and general.

A novus homo ("new man"), Mallius was elected to the consulship of the Roman Republic in 105 BC. He was sent as consul to the province of Transalpine Gaul to stop the migration of the Cimbri and the Teutons. However, when he arrived with his army, the proconsul in the field, Quintus Servilius Caepio, refused to cooperate with Mallius because of his novus homo status. The proconsul's army remained on the far side of the River Rhône, keeping them disunited, even in defiance of envoys from the Senate. With Caepio encamping between Mallius' army and Cimbri, the migrating tribes attacked and overran both armies in detail at the Battle of Arausio.

Mallius lost his sons in the battle and after his return to Rome he was impeached for the loss of his army. The prosecution was led by Saturninus, who was able to secure a conviction which drove Mallius into exile, placing Mallius under an aquae et ignis interdictio by a rogatio; that is, like Cicero later, he was "denied water and fire", a formulaic expression of banishment (see Law of majestas). The proconsul Quintus Servilius Caepio, blamed by all the ancient historians for the defeat, was also exiled.

The defeat at Arausio created fear in Rome for the safety of the Italian peninsula and the continuation of the Republic. The Assembly then took the unprecedented and then-illegal step of electing, in absentia, Gaius Marius, then proconsul in Africa prosecuting the Jugurthine War, to a second consulship in three years to deal with the threat.

References

Senators of the Roman Republic
Ancient Roman generals
Maximus, Gnaeus
2nd-century BC Roman consuls
Ancient Roman exiles
People of the Cimbrian War